Lenka Kunčíková (born 29 July 1995) is a Czech former tennis player.

On 10 August 2015, she reached her career-high singles ranking of world No. 588. On 12 September 2016, she peaked at No. 97 in the WTA doubles rankings. In her career, she won one singles title and 13 doubles titles on the ITF Women's Circuit.

Kunčíková made her WTA Tour main-draw debut at the 2015 Nürnberger Versicherungscup in the doubles draw, partnering Karolína Stuchlá.

ITF finals

Singles (1–1)

Doubles (13–9)

External links
 
 

1995 births
Living people
Czech female tennis players
Sportspeople from Nový Jičín
21st-century Czech women